BarberShop 2: Back in Business Soundtrack is the soundtrack to Kevin Rodney Sullivan's 2004 comedy film Barbershop 2: Back in Business. It was released on February 3, 2004 through Interscope Records and consists of hip hop and R&B music. The album peaked at number 18 on the Billboard 200, at number 8 on the Top R&B/Hip-Hop Albums chart and at number 1 on the Top Soundtracks chart in the United States.

Track listing 

Notes
Track 5 contains sampled portions of "Never Too Much" by Luther Vandross
Track 6 contains elements from "Tappan Zee" by Bob James
Track 7 contains an interpolation of "Damn!" by YoungBloodZ
Track 8 contains excerpts from "Aht Uh Mi Hed" by Shuggie Otis
Track 9 contains samples from "School Boy Crush" by Average White Band
Track 13 contains sampled portions from "Weekend Girl" by The S.O.S. Band
Track 14 contains sampled portions of "Shine" by Lamont Dozier

Charts

References

External links

2004 soundtrack albums
2000s film soundtrack albums
Albums produced by Dr. Dre
Albums produced by Lil Jon
Albums produced by Ron Fair
Albums produced by Mr. Porter
Albums produced by Polow da Don
Albums produced by the Neptunes
Albums produced by Organized Noize
Albums produced by Havoc (musician)
Barbershop (franchise)
Comedy film soundtracks
Contemporary R&B soundtracks
Hip hop soundtracks
Interscope Records soundtracks